Naval Information Forces (NAVIFOR) is an Echelon III command under US Fleet Forces Command, (USFLTFORCOM). It is the Type Command (TYCOM) for meteorology and oceanography, cryptology/SIGINT, cyber, electronic warfare, information operations, intelligence, networks, and space disciplines. Like other TYCOMs, this is the manpower, training, modernization, and maintenance component for these disciplines. NAVIFOR's mission is to support operational commanders ashore and afloat by providing combat-ready information warfare forces, which are forward deployable, fully trained, properly crewed, capably equipped, always ready, well maintained and combat sustainable. The current commander of NAVIFOR is Vice Admiral Kelly Aeschbach.

On February 9, 2016, the command was renamed from Navy Information Dominance Forces (NAVIDFOR) to Naval Information Forces as part of the alignment of the Information Dominance Corps under its new name, the Information Warfare Community. In June 2018 
Vice Admiral Brian B. Brown took command of NAVIFOR.

On May 7, 2021, Vice Admiral Brian B. Brown was relieved by Vice Admiral Kelly A. Aeschbach in a ceremony at a Department of Homeland Security complex in Suffolk, Virginia.

List of commanders

See also
 Fleet Cyber Command/Tenth Fleet
 U.S. Cyber Command
 U.S. Navy Cyber Forces

References

External links
Naval Information Forces (NAVIFOR)
NAVIDFOR on IDC Self Synchronization

Commands of the United States Navy
Military units and formations established in 2014